Kumagai (written: 熊谷 lit. "bear valley"), also transliterated as Kumagae, is a Japanese surname. Notable people with the surname include:

, Japanese footballer
, Japanese writer
, Japanese tennis player
, Japanese footballer
, Japanese actress
, Japanese footballer
Mie Kumagai, Japanese video game producer
, Japanese photographer
, Japanese kickboxer
, Japanese soldier
Noriaki Kumagai (born 1970), Japanese drummer
, Japanese footballer
, Japanese voice actor
, Japanese voice actor

Fictional characters:
, character in the manga series Binbō-gami ga!

See also
, eighth of the sixty-nine stations of the Nakasendō
Kumagai Gumi, Japanese construction company

Japanese-language surnames